A rotating detonation engine (RDE) is an engine using a form of pressure gain combustion, where one or more detonations continuously travel around an annular channel. Computational simulations and experimental results have shown that the RDE has potential in transport and other applications.

In detonative combustion, the results expand at supersonic speed. It is theoretically more efficient than conventional deflagrative combustion by as much as 25%. Such an efficiency gain would provide major fuel savings.

Disadvantages include instability and noise.

Concept 
The basic concept of an RDE is a detonation wave that travels around a circular channel (annulus). Fuel and oxidizer are injected into the channel, normally through small holes or slits. A detonation is initiated in the fuel/oxidizer mixture by some form of igniter. After the engine is started, the detonations are self-sustaining. One detonation ignites the fuel/oxidizer mixture, which releases the energy necessary to sustain the detonation. The combustion products expand out of the channel and are pushed out of the channel by the incoming fuel and oxidizer.

Although the RDE's design is similar to the pulse detonation engine (PDE), the RDE is superior because the waves cycle around the chamber, while the PDE requires the chambers to be purged after each pulse.

Development 
Several organizations work on RDEs.

US Navy
The US Navy has been pushing development. Researchers at the Naval Research Laboratory (NRL) have a particular interest in the capability of detonation engines such as the RDE to reduce the fuel consumption of their ships. Several obstacles still must be overcome in order to use the RDE in the field. As of 2012, NRL researchers were focusing on better understanding how the RDE works.

Aerojet Rocketdyne 
Since 2010, Aerojet Rocketdyne has conducted over 520 tests of multiple configurations.

NASA 
Daniel Paxson at the Glenn Research Center used simulations in computational fluid dynamics (CFD) to assess the RDE's detonation frame of reference and compares performance with the PDE. He found that an RDE can perform at least on the same level as a PDE. Furthermore, he found that RDE performance can be directly compared to the PDE as their performance was essentially the same.

On January 25, 2023 NASA reported successfully testing its first full-scale rotating detonation rocket engine (RDRE). This engine produced 4000 lbs of thrust. NASA has stated their intention to create a 10,000 lbs thrust unit as the next research step.

Energomash 
According to Russian Vice Prime Minister Dmitry Rogozin, in mid-January 2018 NPO Energomash company completed the initial test phase of a 2-ton class liquid propellant RDE and plans to develop larger models for use in space launch vehicles.

Purdue University
In May 2016, a team of engineering researchers affiliated with the US Air Force developed a rotating detonation rocket engine operating with a liquid oxygen and natural gas as propellants. Additional RDE testing was conducted at Purdue University, including a test article called "Detonation Rig for Optical, Non-intrusive Experimental measurements (DRONE)", an "unwrapped" semi-bounded, linear detonation channel experiment. IN Space LLC, in a contract with the US Air Force, tested a 22,000 newton thrust (5000 lbf) rotating detonation rocket engine (RDRE) while testing with liquid oxygen and gaseous methane at Purdue University in 2021.

University of Central Florida
In May 2020, a team of engineering researchers affiliated with the US Air Force claimed to have developed a highly experimental working model rotating detonation engine capable of producing 200lbf (approximately 890N) of thrust operating on a hydrogen/oxygen fuel mix.

JAXA
On July 26th 2021 (UTC), Japan Aerospace Exploration Agency (JAXA) succeeded in testing the RDE in space for the first time in the world by launching the S-520-31 sounding rocket equipped with a 500N class RDE in the second stage.

Łukasiewicz Research Network - Institute of Aviation 
On September 15th 2021, Institute of Aviation performed the first successful flight test of an experimental rocket powered by a rocket engine using the process of rotating detonation, powered by liquid propellants. The test took place on September 15, 2021 at the testing ground of the Military Institute of Armament Technology in Zielonka near Warsaw in Poland. The rocket engine, according to the plan, worked for 3.2 s, accelerating the rocket to a speed of about  90 m/s, which allowed the rocket to reach an altitude of 450 m.

Other research
Other experiments have used numerical procedures to better understand the flow-field of the RDE.  In 2020 a study from the University of Washington explored an experimental device that allowed control of parameters such as the size of the cylinder gap.  Using a high-speed camera researchers were able to view it operating in extreme slow motion.  Based on that they developed a mathematical model to describe the process.  In 2021 researchers from the University of Central Florida have managed to build for the first time a technical prototype of an oblique wave detonation engine (OWDE).

In 2021, the Institute of Mechanics, Chinese Academy of Sciences, successfully tested the world's first hypersonic detonation wave engine powered by kerosene, which could propel a plane at Mach 9.

References

External links 

 Video demonstrating how the RDE works
 Daniel Paxson's research paper on his findings of the RDE

Gas turbines
Combustion
Emerging technologies